The leaden honeyeater (Ptiloprora plumbea) is a species of bird in the family Meliphagidae.
It is found in the New Guinea Highlands.
Its natural habitat is subtropical or tropical moist montane forests.

References

leaden honeyeater
Birds of New Guinea
leaden honeyeater
Taxonomy articles created by Polbot
Taxa named by Tommaso Salvadori